Kiwanis Ravine is an  public park a block east of Discovery Park in the Magnolia neighborhood of Seattle, Washington. Purchased by the Kiwanis Club in the 1950s and donated to Seattle Parks Department, it is home to the largest nesting colony of great blue herons in the city.

External links
Parks Department page on Kiwanis Ravine

Parks in Seattle
Kiwanis
Magnolia, Seattle